The Ukraine women's national ice hockey team is the women's national ice hockey team of Ukraine. The team is controlled by the Ice Hockey Federation of Ukraine, a member of the International Ice Hockey Federation.  They made their World Championship debut in 2019 winning all four games to gain promotion to Division II B.

History
Ukraine played its first game in 1992 in a qualification game against Latvia for participation in the 1993 Women's European Ice Hockey Championships. The game was held in Riga, Latvia with Ukraine finishing with a 3–0 win. The game was part of a four team qualification series against Italy, Latvia, and the Netherlands but due to the withdrawals of Italy and the Netherlands the series was reduced to three games between Ukraine and Latvia which Ukraine won two games to one. The following year Ukraine competed at the 1993 Women's European Ice Hockey Championships. They played five games in the Group B tournament which was held in Kyiv, Ukraine. They finished the tournament with one win out of their four games played, managing only to beat Latvia who finished on top of the Group B table.

In 1994 Ukraine competed at the Moscow Tournament against Finland, Latvia, and Russia. They lost all three of their games with the 31–0 loss against Finland being recorded as their worst ever result. The following year Ukraine competed at the 1995 Women's European Ice Hockey Championships. They were placed in the Group B tournament being held in Denmark and went on to lose all four of their games.

Tournament record

World Championship
2019 – 35th place (1st in Division IIB Q, promoted to Division IIB)
2020 – 34th place (6th in Division IIB, relegated to Division III)
2021 – Cancelled due to the COVID-19 pandemic

Other tournaments
1993 Women's European Ice Hockey Championships. Finish: 5th in Group B (11th overall)
1994 Moscow Tournament. Finish: 4th
1995 Women's European Ice Hockey Championships. Finish: 8th in Group B (14th overall)

See also
Ukraine men's national ice hockey team
Ukraine men's national junior ice hockey team

References

External links

IIHF profile
National Teams of Ice Hockey

Ice hockey
Women's national ice hockey teams in Europe